The Mix is a digital charity based in the UK. Their primary goal is to address 'the embarrassing issues' and issues dear to the hearts of the young people who use its service - from exam stress to sex. The charity works with anyone under the age of 25 and offers support through a range of channels, including a free helpline and chat service, articles and peer-to-peer community chats. In addition, The Mix offers young people the opportunity to have a say in what the charity supports and advocates for, and provides volunteering and training opportunities.

History 
Two charities supporting young people, YouthNet (founded 1995) and Get Connected (founded 1991), merged in March 2016. YouthNet offered online support and counselling, while Get Connected maintained a telephone counselling service. Both services remain part of The Mix's offering. The official name of the company and charity is "YouthNet UK (trading as 'The Mix')".

Core services 
The Mix offers all of its support digitally, which means that its core services are delivered through multiple channels and always remotely. Their services include:

 Article content
 Video content
 A free and anonymised helpline (4 pm to 11 pm every day)
 Crisis messenger
 Community forums (peer-to-peer support)
 Email
 Group chats
 Counselling (free, instigated by self-referrals)

Apps and tools 
"Stressheads" is an app available on Android and iOS devices and via internet browsers, intended as a distraction tool for young people. It was co-developed by a group of young volunteers, YouthNet (now The Mix) and Neon Tribe. It was supported by Capital One. "Stepfinder" is a mobile app for iOS devices that helps young people find the nearest support service. The app was developed with Scramboo.

"Motimator" is a mobile app for Android and iOS devices that aims to inspire and motivate young jobseekers on their journey into employment. It was launched by YouthNet (now The Mix) in cooperation with O2.

"Home Truths" is a web tool to help young people live independently and understand what to expect when living on their own for the first time. This tool was developed with the support of Experian and Affinity Sutton.

"Define Me" is a web tool that helps young people translate their experiences into skills that employers are looking for. It was developed with the support of UBS AG.

"Let's Talk Consent Tool" is a web app that guides users through a series of questions to help them understand if they are legally allowed to have sex with someone.

Youth research and insights 
To develop a better understanding of young people and respond to their needs, The Mix develops many of its services in consultation with young people - through co-creation sessions. The Mix has also conducted several research studies to better understand young people, their behaviour, the challenges they face and the lives they lead. These include: 
 Youth Employability: Pining Down the Future of Digital Badging (2017) – A report that concluded a two-year project.The aim was to improve the employability of young people in the UK and Denmark by developing informal online learning opportunities that can be recognised with a digital badge that is transferable across Europe. The project was funded by the European Union through the Erasmus+ programme and implemented by The Mix and the Centre for Digital Youth Care (CDYC).
 YouthLabs – Young People’s on-going relationship with social media (2015) – An ethnographic research project created by YouthNet (now The Mix) and DigitasLBi. It was designed to capture the voices, opinions and concerns of young people engaging with social media in the UK.
 Connected Generation report (2015) – Get Connected (now The Mix) surveyed 5,000 children and young people under 25 across the UK about the problems they face in the modern world, as well as how well they feel supported and how they prefer to seek help when they have a personal problem.
 Connecting the dots ( 2014) – YouthNet conducted a three-month, collaborative research project with employers, sector colleagues working in employability and young people to explore the role that digital support can play in a young person's journey into work.
 Hidden homelessness in young people (2013) – A research project that looked at how young people end up homeless. YouthNet (now The Mix) led a six-month collaborative research project with leading housing experts and young people to explore the role digital support can play in supporting young people experiencing homelessness.
 Supporting young people through mobile technology (2013) – This study has identified insights and trends in the way young people seek help in the mobile environment. It illustrates YouthNet's (now The Mix) innovative approach to supporting them.

Organisation 
The Mix is made up of a mixture of paid staff and volunteers. It is one of eight charity partners working with the Royal Foundation of the Duke and Duchess of Cambridge and the Duke and Duchess of Sussex to deliver Heads Together, a national campaign to tackle mental health stigma. It works with several other organisations – including CentrePoint – to provide support services for young people.

The CEO is Chris Martin.

External links

References 

Charities for young adults
Information technology organisations based in the United Kingdom
Organisations based in the City of Westminster
Youth charities based in the United Kingdom